John Souza-Benavides (July 12, 1920 – March 11, 2012)  known as John "Clarkie" Souza,  was an American soccer player who earned 14 caps and scored 2 goals for the United States men's national soccer team, and played in the U.S. team's historic 1–0 victory over England in the 1950 FIFA World Cup. He was selected for a World Cup All-Star team by the Brazilian sports newspaper Mundo Esportivo, and remained the only American player ever selected to a World Cup All-Star team until Claudio Reyna in 2002.  He is a member of the National Soccer Hall of Fame. He was born in Fall River, Massachusetts and died in Dover, Pennsylvania.

Souza is sometimes credited as having scored two goals  in the tournament but modern sources indicate he scored neither; Gino Pariani scored against Spain and Frank Wallace scored their first goal against Chile.

Souza was a member of the Fall River Ponta Delgada team that won the National Challenge Cup in 1947, as well as the National Amateur Cup for three consecutive years, from 1946 to 1948. In 1951, he transferred to the New York German-Hungarians and proceeded to again win both the National Challenge Cup and the National Amateur Cup that year. Souza was a member of the U.S. team for both the 1948 and 1952 Summer Olympics, and played for the U.S. against Scotland at Hampden Park in 1952.

He was a World War II veteran, having served in the Navy as a Morse code operator on a supply ship in the South Pacific. He is buried with his wife Anita at Massachusetts National Cemetery, Bourne, Massachusetts.

He was not related to his teammate Ed Souza.

References

1920 births
2012 deaths
Sportspeople from Fall River, Massachusetts
American people of Portuguese descent
Ponta Delgada S.C. players
United States men's international soccer players
National Soccer Hall of Fame members
1950 FIFA World Cup players
Footballers at the 1948 Summer Olympics
Footballers at the 1952 Summer Olympics
Olympic soccer players of the United States
Soccer players from Massachusetts
United States Navy personnel of World War II
American soccer players
Association football forwards
United States Navy sailors